Pulmonaria mollis is a perennial species of herb. It is very similar to  P. angustifolia.

The species is native to various parts of Europe and Asia.

Subspecies
The subspecies for this species include:

 Pulmonaria mollis subsp. alpigena W. Sauer
 Pulmonaria mollis subsp. mollis Hornem.

Distribution and habitat
It is native to Germany, China, Turkey, Poland, Ukraine, Mongolia,  Bulgaria, and Russia. In England it is cultivated for its basal leaves. 

It often occurs in low abundance and can be found in deciduous forests, meadow slopes, as well stony places in the shade.

References

Pulmonaria